Muntirayuq (Quechua muntira  ancient cloth cap; bullfighter's hat, -yuq a suffix, 'the one with a cap', also spelled Monterayoc) is a mountain in the Wansu mountain range in the Andes of Peru, about  high. It lies in the Apurímac Region, Antabamba Province, Antabamba District. Muntirayuq is situated north of Saywa Punta and east of Pachak Pata.

References 

Mountains of Peru
Mountains of Apurímac Region